Ernest Jones (1879–1958) was a Welsh neurologist, psychoanalyst, and Sigmund Freud's official biographer.

Ernest Jones may also refer to:

Sportspeople

American football
Ernest T. Jones (born 1970), head football coach at Alcorn State University
Ernest Jones (defensive lineman) (born 1971), American football player
Ernest Jones (linebacker) (born 1999), American football player

Other sportspeople
Ernest William Jones (1870–1941), Anglo-Welsh cricketer and trans-European shipping magnate
Ernest Jones (footballer) (1871–1959), Australian rules footballer
Ernest Jones (golfer) (1887–1965), English professional golfer
Ernest Jones (rugby league), rugby league footballer of the 1910s and 1920s for Great Britain, England, and Rochdale Hornets
Ernest Mint Jones (born 1910), American baseball player

Other people
Ernest Charles Jones (1819–1869), English poet, novelist, and Chartist
Ernest Lester Jones (1876–1929), hydrographic and geodetic engineer
Ernest LaRue Jones (1882–1955), aviation pioneer, see Early Birds of Aviation
Ernest Jones (trade unionist) (1895–1973), English coal miner
Ernest Jones (retailer), a national jewellery retailer in the United Kingdom, owned by Signet Group
Ernest W. Jones (1910–2005), Canadian politician

See also
Ernie Jones (disambiguation)